Upware Bridge Pit North is a  geological Site of Special Scientific Interest northwest of Wicken in Cambridgeshire. It is a Geological Conservation Review site.

This site shows exposes rocks of Oxfordian age, around 160 million years old, formed when the area was in a sea connected to the Tethys Ocean; it has many Tethyan invertebrate fossils. It is described by Natural England as "an essential site for the study of Oxfordian palaeontology and palaeogeography in the English midlands".

The site is a working quarry. There is no public access, but there is a viewing platform. The Fen Rivers Way passes the site.

References

Sites of Special Scientific Interest in Cambridgeshire
Geological Conservation Review sites
Wicken, Cambridgeshire